Don Friday (born April 17, 1968) is an American college basketball coach, and the former men's basketball head coach at Saint Francis University, being named to the post in April 2008. He previously served as head coach at Lycoming College (2003–2008), assistant coach at Bucknell University (1994–2003), and assistant coach at Lebanon Valley College (1990–1994). At Lebanon Valley and Bucknell, he coached under Pat Flannery, and in 1994 he assisted Flannery as Lebanon Valley won the 1994 Division III National Championship. He was the MAC coach of the year twice as the men's head coach at Lycoming University. Friday has a true knowledge of the game. In 2012, he was fired at Saint Francis after several years of poor results and frequent transfers away from the school. Friday was hired by head coach Frank Marcinek at Susquehanna University; after that brief stop Friday is now the head coach at Penn State Harrisburg and is turning the program around.  Friday captured a win on number-15-ranked Christopher Newport, one of the biggest upsets in program history. Friday earned a bachelor's degree in business from Lebanon Valley College. He currently resides in Annville with his son Donald, his wife Amy, and dog Patriot. Friday also holds elite clinics and coaches clinics to help coaches and players perform at the best of their ability.

References

External links
 Penn State Harrisburg profile
Career of Don Friday

1968 births
Living people
American men's basketball coaches
Basketball coaches from Pennsylvania
Bucknell Bison men's basketball coaches
College men's basketball head coaches in the United States
Lebanon Valley College alumni
Lebanon Valley Flying Dutchmen men's basketball coaches
Lycoming Warriors men's basketball coaches
Saint Francis Red Flash men's basketball coaches
People from Schuylkill County, Pennsylvania